Michael David Spivak (25 May 19401 October 2020) was an American mathematician specializing in differential geometry, an expositor of mathematics, and the founder of Publish-or-Perish Press.  Spivak was the author of the five-volume A Comprehensive Introduction to Differential Geometry.

Biography
Spivak was born in Queens, New York. He received an A.B. from Harvard University in 1960, while in 1964 he received a Ph.D. from Princeton University under the supervision of John Milnor, with thesis On Spaces Satisfying Poincaré Duality. In 1985 Spivak received the Leroy P. Steele Prize.

Spivak lectured on elementary physics.  Spivak's book, Physics for Mathematicians: Mechanics I (published December 6, 2010), contains the material that these lectures stemmed from and more. Spivak was also the designer of the MathTime Professional 2 fonts (which are widely used in academic publishing) and the creator of Science International.

Writing
His five-volume A Comprehensive Introduction to Differential Geometry (Publish or Perish Inc., 1970; 2nd ed., 1979; 3rd ed., 1999, revised 2005) is among his most influential and celebrated works.  The distinctive pedagogical aim of the work, as stated in its preface, was to elucidate for graduate students the often obscure relationship between classical differential geometry—geometrically intuitive but imprecise—and its modern counterpart, replete with precise but unintuitive algebraic definitions.  On several occasions, most prominently in Volume 2, Spivak "translates" the classical language that Gauss or Riemann would be familiar with to the abstract language that a modern differential geometer might use.  The Leroy P. Steele Prize was awarded to Spivak in 1985 for his authorship of the work.

Spivak also authored several well-known undergraduate textbooks.  Among them, his textbook Calculus (W. A. Benjamin Inc., 1967; Publish or Perish, 4th ed., 2008) takes a rigorous and theoretical approach to introductory calculus and includes proofs of many theorems taken on faith in most other introductory textbooks. Spivak acknowledged in the preface of the second edition that the work is arguably an introduction to mathematical analysis rather than a calculus textbook. Another of his well-known textbooks is Calculus on Manifolds (W. A. Benjamin Inc., 1965; Addison-Wesley, revised edition, 1968), a concise (146 pages) but rigorous and modern treatment of multivariable calculus accessible to advanced undergraduates.

Spivak also wrote The Joy of TeX: A Gourmet Guide to Typesetting With the AMS-TeX Macro Package and The Hitchhiker's Guide to Calculus. The book Morse Theory, by John Milnor, was based on lecture notes by Spivak and Robert Wells (as mentioned on the cover page of the booklet).

Spivak pronouns

Spivak used a set of English gender-neutral pronouns in his book The Joy of TeX, which are often referred to as Spivak pronouns. (Spivak stated that he did not originate these pronouns.)

Bibliography
 
 Calculus on Manifolds: A Modern Approach to Classical Theorems of Advanced Calculus, (1965, revised 1968)
 Calculus, (1967, 4th ed. 2008)
 A Comprehensive Introduction to Differential Geometry, (1970, revised 3rd ed. 2005)
 The Joy of TeX: A Gourmet Guide to Typesetting with the AMS-TeX Macro package, (1990)
 A Hitchhiker's Guide to the Calculus, (1995)

See also
 Stable normal bundle
 Spivak pronoun

Notes

References

External links
 Publish or Perish, Inc., company owned by Spivak
 17 (Seventeen) and Yellow Pigs
 Michael Spivak @ Everything2.com
 
 Michael D. Spivak, 1940-2020, obituary in TUGboat by Barbara Beeton

1940 births
2020 deaths
American textbook writers
American male non-fiction writers
20th-century American mathematicians
Differential geometers
Mathematical analysts
Princeton University alumni
People from Queens, New York
Mathematicians from New York (state)
Topologists
Harvard University alumni